Aaron Ray Long (born October 12, 1992) is an American professional soccer player who plays as a center-back for Major League Soccer club Los Angeles FC and the United States national team. Born in Oak Hills, California, Long played four seasons of college soccer for the UC Riverside Highlanders before being drafted in the second round of the 2014 MLS SuperDraft by the Portland Timbers with the 36th overall pick. After loan spells with USL Pro clubs Sacramento Republic and Orange County Blues, Long was released by the Timbers and subsequently signed by rivals Seattle Sounders FC.

Long was part of the Sounders organization for two seasons. After not making an appearance for the senior team, Long signed a contract with their reserve side, Seattle Sounders 2. He spent a season with Sounders 2 before joining the New York Red Bulls II in 2016. During his one season with Red Bulls II, Long helped the side win the USL championship and was named the USL Defender of the Year. Long then established himself as a starting center-back for the New York Red Bulls in 2017. In 2018, Long had a career breakout season, earning a spot as a MLS All-Star, winning MLS Defender of the Year Award, and helping the Red Bulls win the Supporters' Shield. His performance that season helped earn Long his debut for the United States against Peru.

Youth and college
Long graduated from Serrano High School where he lettered in both football and soccer. Long played four years of college soccer at UC Riverside between 2010 and 2013, recording 13 goals and 5 assists during those years. While at college, Long also appeared for USL PDL club FC Tucson during their 2012 and 2013 seasons.

Professional career

Portland Timbers
Long was drafted by Portland Timbers in the second round (36th overall) of the 2014 MLS SuperDraft. After signing with Portland, Long was loaned to their USL Pro affiliate Sacramento Republic, where he made his debut on March 29, 2014, in a 1–1 draw against LA Galaxy II. He also played for Orange County Blues during the 2014 season on a short-term loan.
Long was released by Portland on July 2, 2014.

Seattle Sounders FC
Long joined Seattle Sounders FC during the 2014 season, but did not make an appearance with the first team. On March 14, 2015, Long signed with Seattle Sounders FC 2. On July 12, 2015, Long scored his first goal as a professional in a 4–0 victory over Arizona United SC. He was a regular starter for Sounders 2 playing as a midfielder before being converted to centerback, appearing in 28 matches and recording one goal and two assists.

New York Red Bulls

Long went on trial with New York Red Bulls during the 2016 pre-season, and on March 10, 2016, signed with affiliate club New York Red Bulls II. Long made his official debut for the club appearing as a starter in a 2–2 draw against Toronto FC II. On June 19, 2016, Long scored his first goal for the club helping them to a 2–2 draw at Orlando City B. On June 26, 2016, Long helped New York to a 4–1 victory against the Wilmington Hammerheads scoring the club's second goal of the match.

On August 16, 2016, Long made his debut for the Red Bulls first team,  appearing as a starter in a 1–1 draw against Alianza F.C. in the CONCACAF Champions League. On October 2, 2016, Long scored two goals to help New York Red Bulls II advance to the Eastern Conference Semifinals of the 2016 USL Playoffs in a 4–0 victory over Orlando City B.
 On October 18, 2016, Long was named to the 2016 USL All-League First Team. Days later Long helped the club to a 5–1 victory over Swope Park Rangers in the 2016 USL Cup Final. Long was named as the 2016 USL Defender of the Year after leading a defense that conceded the fewest goals in the league during the regular season.

On September 2, 2017, Long scored his first goal with New York Red Bulls in a 2–2 draw at FC Dallas. He ended his first full season with the first team appearing in 41 matches and scoring 1 goal, establishing himself as a first choice center-back.

On March 31, 2018, Long scored his first goal of the 2018 season for the New York Red Bulls in a 4–3 loss to Orlando City SC. On June 6, 2018, Long scored the second goal of the match in New York's 4–0 derby win over New York City FC in the fourth round of the 2018 Lamar Hunt U.S. Open Cup. On June 23, 2018, Long scored another goal in a 3–0 victory over FC Dallas. On July 29, 2018, Long was named to the MLS All-Star Team for their 2018 friendly against Juventus F.C.. Long was named 2018 MLS defender of the year after leading the Red Bull's defense in conceding only 33 goals all season long as the club captured the 2018 MLS Supporters' Shield.

In May during the 2021 MLS season, Long ruptured his Achilles tendon, which ruled him out for the remainder of the season. On February 26, 2022, after a long absence due to injury, Long appeared as a starter in a 3-1 victory over San Jose Earthquakes in the opening match of the 2022 season. On March 5, 2022, Long scored his first goal of the season in a 4-1 victory over Toronto FC. On July 12, 2022, Long was named to the MLS All-Star Team for the second time in his career, this time for their 2022 friendly against the Liga MX All-Stars.

Los Angeles FC

On January 4, 2023, Long signed a two-year contract with Los Angeles FC. He was a free agent and attracted offers from Seattle Sounders FC, Inter Miami CF,  Monterrey, Cruz Azul, and two unnamed English clubs.

International career
On September 2, 2018, Long received his first call-up to the United States national team. He made his first international appearance in a 1–1 draw against Peru. The following year, he captained the national team in a 3–0 friendly victory against Panama on January 27, 2019. In June 2019, Long was called up to his first international tournament when Gregg Berhalter named him to the final roster for the 2019 CONCACAF Gold Cup. On June 22, 2019, Long scored his first two international goals in a Gold Cup victory over Trinidad and Tobago.

Career statistics

Club

International

Scores and results list United States' goal tally first, score column indicates score after each Long goal.

Honors
New York Red Bulls II
USL Cup: 2016

New York Red Bulls
MLS Supporters' Shield: 2018

Individual
USL Defender of the Year: 2016
MLS All-Star: 2018, 2022
MLS Defender of the Year: 2018
MLS Best XI: 2018
CONCACAF Gold Cup Best XI: 2019

References

External links

 
 

1992 births
Living people
American soccer players
UC Riverside Highlanders men's soccer players
FC Tucson players
Portland Timbers players
Sacramento Republic FC players
Orange County SC players
Seattle Sounders FC players
Tacoma Defiance players
New York Red Bulls players
New York Red Bulls II players
Los Angeles FC players
Soccer players from California
Sportspeople from San Bernardino County, California
Portland Timbers draft picks
USL League Two players
USL Championship players
Major League Soccer players
United States men's international soccer players
2019 CONCACAF Gold Cup players
2022 FIFA World Cup players
Association football central defenders